This list of Catholic dioceses and archdioceses of Brazil which includes both the dioceses of the Latin Church, which employ the Latin liturgical rites, and various other dioceses, primarily the eparchies of the Eastern Catholic Churches, which employ various Eastern Christian rites, and which are in full communion with the Pope in Rome.

The Catholic Church in Brazil has a total of 275 particular churches — consisting of 44 archdioceses (which head 44 ecclesiastical provinces), 218 dioceses (2 of which are Eastern eparchies under Latin jurisdiction), 7 territorial prelatures, the Archeparchy of São João Batista em Curitiba and the Eparchy of Imaculada Conceição in Prudentópolis under the Ukrainian Greek Catholic Church, the Armenian Catholic Apostolic Exarchate of Latin America and Mexico,  the Ordinariate for the Faithful of Eastern Rites in Brazil, the Military Ordinariate of Brazil, and the Personal Apostolic Administration of Saint John Mary Vianney (the only personal apostolic administration in the world). These 275 divisions make the largest number of particular churches in any country.

Sui iuris Latin Church Jurisdictions 
 Exempt dioceses, directly subject to the Holy See
 Military Ordinariate of Brazil, for the armed force
 Personal Apostolic Administration of Saint John Mary Vianney (traditionalist Tridentine Mass variation on the Roman Rite)

 Latin (or mixed) Catholic Provinces in Brazil 

 Ecclesiastical province of Aparecida 
 Metropolitan Archdiocese of Aparecida
Diocese of Caraguatatuba
Diocese of Lorena
Diocese of São José dos Campos
Diocese of Taubaté

 Ecclesiastical province of Aracaju 
 Metropolitan Archdiocese of Aracaju
Diocese of Estância
Diocese of Propriá

 Ecclesiastical province of Belém do Pará 
 Metropolitan Archdiocese of Belém do Pará
Diocese of Abaetetuba
Diocese of Bragança do Pará
Diocese of Cametá
Diocese of Castanhal
Diocese of Macapá
Diocese of Marabá
Diocese of Ponta de Pedras
Diocese of Santíssima Conceição do Araguaia
Prelature of Marajó

 Ecclesiastical province of Belo Horizonte 
 Metropolitan Archdiocese of Belo Horizonte
Diocese of Divinópolis
Diocese of Luz
Diocese of Oliveira
Diocese of Sete Lagoas

 Ecclesiastical province of Botucatu 
 Metropolitan Archdiocese of Botucatu
Diocese of Araçatuba
Diocese of Assis
Diocese of Bauru
Diocese of Lins
Diocese of Marília
Diocese of Ourinhos
Diocese of Presidente Prudente

 Ecclesiastical province of Brasília 
 Metropolitan Archdiocese of Brasília
Diocese of Formosa
Diocese of Luziânia
Diocese of Uruaçu

 Ecclesiastical province of Campinas 
 Metropolitan Archdiocese of Campinas
Diocese of Amparo
Diocese of Bragança Paulista
Diocese of Limeira
Diocese of Piracicaba
Diocese of São Carlos

 Ecclesiastical province of Campo Grande 
 Metropolitan Archdiocese of Campo Grande
Diocese of Corumbá
Diocese of Coxim
Diocese of Dourados
Diocese of Naviraí
Diocese of Jardim
Diocese of Três Lagoas

 Ecclesiastical province of Cascavel 
 Metropolitan Archdiocese of Cascavel
Diocese of Foz do Iguaçu
Diocese of Palmas-Francisco Beltrão
Diocese of Toledo

 Ecclesiastical province of Cuiabá 
Metropolitan Archdiocese of Cuiabá
Diocese of Barra do Garças
Diocese of Diamantino
Diocese of Guiratinga
Diocese of Juína
Diocese of Paranatinga
Diocese of Rondonópolis
Diocese of São Luíz de Cáceres
Prelature of São Félix

 Ecclesiastical province of Curitiba 
Metropolitan Archdiocese of Curitiba
Diocese of Guarapuava
Diocese of Paranaguá
Diocese of Ponta Grossa
Diocese of União da Vitória
Diocese of São José dos Pinhais

 Ecclesiastical province of Diamantina 
 Metropolitan Archdiocese of Diamantina
Diocese of Almenara
Diocese of Araçuaí
Diocese of Guanhães
Diocese of Teófilo Otoni

 Ecclesiastical province of Feira de Santana 
 Metropolitan Archdiocese of Feira de Santana
Diocese of Barra do Rio Grande
Diocese of Barreiras
Diocese of Bonfim
Diocese of Irecê
Diocese of Juazeiro
Diocese of Paulo Afonso
Diocese of Ruy Barbosa
Diocese of Serrinha

 Ecclesiastical province of Florianópolis 
 Metropolitan Archdiocese of Florianópolis
Diocese of Blumenau
Diocese of Caçador
Diocese of Chapecó
Diocese of Criciúma
Diocese of Joaçaba
Diocese of Joinville
Diocese of Lages
Diocese of Rio do Sul
Diocese of Tubarão

 Ecclesiastical province of Fortaleza 
 Metropolitan Archdiocese of Fortaleza
Diocese of Crateús
Diocese of Crato
Diocese of Iguatú
Diocese of Itapipoca
Diocese of Limoeiro do Norte
Diocese of Quixadá
Diocese of Sobral
Diocese of Tianguá

 Ecclesiastical province of Goiânia 
 Metropolitan Archdiocese of Goiânia
Diocese of Anápolis
diocese of Goiás
Diocese of Ipameri
Diocese of Itumbiara
Diocese of Jataí
Diocese of Rubiataba-Mozarlândia
Diocese of São Luís de Montes Belos

 Ecclesiastical province of Juiz de Fora 
 Metropolitan Archdiocese of Juiz de Fora
Diocese of Leopoldina
Diocese of São João del Rei

 Ecclesiastical province of Londrina 
 Metropolitan Archdiocese of Londrina
Diocese of Apucarana
Diocese of Cornélio Procópio
Diocese of Jacarezinho

 Ecclesiastical province of Maceió 
 Metropolitan Archdiocese of Maceió
Diocese of Palmeira dos Índios
Diocese of Penedo

 Ecclesiastical province of Manaus 
 Metropolitan Archdiocese of Manaus
Diocese of Alto Solimões
Diocese of Borba
Diocese of Coari
Diocese of Parintins
Diocese of Roraima
Diocese of São Gabriel da Cachoeira
Prelature of Itacoatiara
Prelature of Tefé

 Ecclesiastical province of Mariana 
Metropolitan Archdiocese of Mariana
Diocese of Caratinga
Diocese of Governador Valadares
Diocese of Itabira–Fabriciano

 Ecclesiastical province of Maringá 
 Metropolitan Archdiocese of Maringá
Diocese of Campo Mourão
Diocese of Paranavaí
Diocese of Umuarama

 Ecclesiastical province of Montes Claros 
Metropolitan Archdiocese of Montes Claros
Diocese of Janaúba
Diocese of Januária
Diocese of Paracatu

 Ecclesiastical province of Natal 
 Metropolitan Archdiocese of Natal
Diocese of Caicó
Diocese of Mossoró

 Ecclesiastical province of Niterói 
 Metropolitan Archdiocese of Niterói
Diocese of Campos
Diocese of Nova Friburgo
Diocese of Petrópolis

 Ecclesiastical province of Olinda e Recife 
 Metropolitan Archdiocese of Olinda e Recife
Diocese of Afogados da Ingazeira
Diocese of Caruaru
Diocese of Floresta
Diocese of Garanhuns
Diocese of Nazaré
Diocese of Palmares
Diocese of Pesqueira
Diocese of Petrolina
Diocese of Salgueiro

 Ecclesiastical province of Palmas 
 Metropolitan Archdiocese of Palmas
Diocese of Araguaína
Diocese of Cristalândia
Diocese of Miracema do Tocantins
Diocese of Porto Nacional
Diocese of Tocantinópolis

 Ecclesiastical province of Paraíba 
 Metropolitan Archdiocese of Paraíba
Diocese of Cajazieras
Diocese of Campina Grande
Diocese of Guarabira
Diocese of Patos

 Ecclesiastical province of Passo Fundo 
 Metropolitan Archdiocese of Passo Fundo
 Diocese of Erexim
 Diocese of Frederico Westphalen
 Diocese of Vacaria

 Ecclesiastical province of Pelotas 
 Metropolitan Archdiocese of Pelotas
Diocese of Bagé
Diocese of Rio Grande

 Ecclesiastical province of Porto Alegre 
Metropolitan Archdiocese of Porto Alegre
Diocese of Caxias do Sul
Diocese of Montenegro
Diocese of Novo Hamburgo
Diocese of Osório

 Ecclesiastical province of Porto Velho 
 Metropolitan Archdiocese of Porto Velho
Diocese of Cruzeiro do Sul
Diocese of Guajará-Mirim
Diocese of Humaitá
Diocese of Ji-Paraná
Diocese of Rio Branco
Prelature of Lábrea

 Ecclesiastical province of Pouso Alegre 
 Metropolitan Archdiocese of Pouso Alegre
Diocese of Campanha
Diocese of Guaxupé

 Ecclesiastical province of Ribeirão Preto 
 Metropolitan Archdiocese of Ribeirão Preto
Diocese of Barretos
Diocese of Catanduva
Diocese of Franca
Diocese of Jaboticabal
Diocese of Jales
Diocese of São João da Boa Vista
Diocese of São José do Rio Preto
Diocese of Votuporanga

 Ecclesiastical province of Santa Maria 
 Metropolitan Archdiocese of Santa Maria
Diocese of Cachoeira do Sul
Diocese of Cruz Alta
Diocese of Santa Cruz do Sul
Diocese of Santo Ângelo
Diocese of Uruguaiana

 Ecclesiastical province of Santarém 
Archdiocese of Santarém
Prelature of Itaituba
Diocese of Óbidos
Diocese of Xingu-Altamira
Territorial Prelature of Alto Xingu-Tecumã

 Ecclesiastical province of São Luís do Maranhão 
 Metropolitan Archdiocese of São Luís do Maranhão
Diocese of Bacabal
Diocese of Balsas
Diocese of Brejo
Diocese of Carolina
Diocese of Caxias do Maranhão
Diocese of Coroatá
Diocese of Grajaú
Diocese of Imperatriz
Diocese of Pinheiro
Diocese of Viana
Diocese of Zé-Doca

 Ecclesiastical province of São Paulo 
 Metropolitan Archdiocese of São Paulo
Diocese of Campo Limpo
Diocese of Guarulhos
Diocese of Mogi das CruzesMaronite Catholic Eparchy of Nossa Senhora do Líbano em São Paulo (Antiochian Rite)Melkite Catholic Eparchy of Nossa Senhora do Paraíso em São Paulo (Byzantine Rite)
Diocese of Osasco
Diocese of Santo Amaro
Diocese of Santo André
Diocese of Santos
Diocese of São Miguel Paulista

 Ecclesiastical province of São Salvador da Bahia 
 Metropolitan and Primatial Archdiocese of São Salvador da Bahia
Diocese of Alagoinhas
Diocese of Amargosa
Diocese of Camaçari
Diocese of Cruz das Almas
Diocese of Eunápolis
Diocese of Ilhéus
Diocese of Itabuna
Diocese of Teixeira de Freitas-Caravelas

 Ecclesiastical province of São Sebastião do Rio de Janeiro 
 Metropolitan Archdiocese of São Sebastião do Rio de Janeiro
Diocese of Barra do Piraí-Volta Redonda
Diocese of Duque de Caxias
Diocese of Itaguaí
Diocese of Nova Iguaçu
Diocese of Valença

Ecclesiastical province of Sorocaba
 Metropolitan Archdiocese of Sorocaba
Diocese of Itapetininga
Diocese of Itapeva
Diocese of Jundiaí
Diocese of Registro

Ecclesiastical province of Teresina
 Metropolitan Archdiocese of Teresina
Diocese of Bom Jesus do Gurguéia
Diocese of Campo Maior
Diocese of Floriano
Diocese of Oeiras
Diocese of Parnaíba
Diocese of Picos
Diocese of São Raimundo Nonato

Ecclesiastical province of Uberaba
 Metropolitan Archdiocese of Uberaba
Diocese of Ituiutaba
Diocese of Patos de Minas
Diocese of Uberlândia

Ecclesiastical province of Vitória
 Metropolitan Archdiocese of Vitória
Diocese of Cachoeiro de Itapemirim
Diocese of Colatina
Diocese of São Mateus

Ecclesiastical province of Vitória da Conquista
 Metropolitan Archdiocese of Vitória da Conquista
Diocese of Bom Jesus da Lapa
Diocese of Caetité
Diocese of Jequié
Diocese of Livramento de Nossa Senhora

 Eastern Catholic proper and exempt jurisdictions 
 Ordinariate for the Faithful of Eastern Rites in Brazil Armenian Catholic Church part of the Armenian Catholic Church (Armenian Rite)
 but exempt, directly subject to the Holy See Armenian Catholic Apostolic Exarchate of Latin America and Mexico Ukrainian Greek Catholic (Byzantine Rite) Ecclesiastical province of São João Batista em Curitiba part of the Eastern particular Ukrainian Greek Catholic Church, using its Ukrainian language Byzantine rite Metropolitan Archeparchy of São João Batista em Curitiba 
 Eparchy of Imaculada Conceição in Prudentópolis (Ukrainian)

 Defunct jurisdictions excluding those which were simply promoted to existing ones above''
 Territorial Prelature of Bananal
 Territorial Abbacy of Claraval
 Diocese of Guiratinga (originally Territorial Prelature)
 Abbacy nullius of Nossa Senhora do Monserrate do Rio de Janeiro
 Territorial Prelate of Paranatinga
 Territorial Prelature of Registro do Araguaia
 Territorial Prelature of São José de Alto Tocantins

Gallery of Brazilian Archdioceses

References and external links 
 Catholic-Hierarchy entry.
 GCatholic.org.

Brazil
Catholic dioceses

it:Chiesa cattolica in Brasile